Steingrímur Jóhann Sigfússon (born 4 August 1955) is an Icelandic politician. He has been a member of the Althing (Icelandic parliament) since 1983 and was the founding chairman of the Left-Green Movement (Vinstri hreyfingin – grænt framboð) from 1999 until 2013. He was the Minister for Agriculture and Communications from 1988 to 1991. He was Minister of Finance from 2009 to 2011. In 2011, he took on the roles of Minister of Fisheries and Agriculture and Minister of Economic Affairs.

Steingrímur was born in Gunnarsstaðir, a large sheep farm between Garður and Þórshöfn in the Þistilfjörður region of northeast Iceland (Svalbarðshreppur municipality). In his younger days he was an avid sportsman, both track and field and also a volleyball player. On 16 January 2006, Steingrímur was injured in a car accident not far from Blönduós but later recovered.

He supported the end of the US military presence in Iceland, but believed Iceland itself should have taken the initiative in ending this presence. Since September 2006, when US forces left Naval Air Station Keflavik, he has strongly opposed any possible development of an Icelandic army seeing the country's need for armed forces as practically non-existent. He believes that civilian institutions such as the police and the coast guard should be organized in order to provide the needed protection in the unlikely event of a major disturbance.

In November 2006, he published the book Við öll – Íslenskt velferðarsamfélag á tímamótum ("All of Us – Icelandic Welfare Society at Crossroads"), laying out his political ideology.

References

External links 
 Nordic Council: Steingrímur J. Sigfússon
  Alþingi: Steingrímur J. Sigfússon

Steingrimur J. Sigfusson
Steingrimur J. Sigfusson
Steingrimur J. Sigfusson
Steingrimur J. Sigfusson
Steingrimur J. Sigfusson
Steingrimur J. Sigfusson
1955 births
Living people
Steingrimur J. Sigfusson